Li Ruogu (born January 1951) is a Chinese banker who served as chairman and president of the Export-Import Bank of China (China Eximbank) from 2005 to 2015.

Biography
Li Ruogu graduated with a Masters in Law from Beijing University in 1981 and a Masters in Public Administration from Princeton University in 1983. He was briefly an assistant professor at Beijing University before joining the People's Bank of China in 1985. In the 1990s, Li spent a year as an International Monetary Fund economist and four years at the Asian Development Bank as the chief representative of China, as well as acting as liaison to the African Development Bank. He was at the position of Deputy Governor in charge of international affairs in the People's Bank of China before moving to China Eximbank in late 2005.

References

1951 births
Living people
Chinese bankers
People's Republic of China economists
Peking University alumni
Princeton University alumni
Members of the 11th Chinese People's Political Consultative Conference